Rick Slor (born 16 August 1971) is a retired professional footballer from the Netherlands, who played for clubs like FC Groningen, FC Emmen and BV Veendam.

External links
 Player profile at Voetbal International

1971 births
Living people
Dutch footballers
FC Groningen players
FC Emmen players
SC Veendam players
People from Veendam

Association football defenders
Footballers from Groningen (province)